Glendhow is a hamlet in Montrose Rural Municipality 315, Saskatchewan, Canada. The hamlet is located southwest of Saskatoon approximately 20 km east of Highway 45.

See also
 List of communities in Saskatchewan
 Hamlets of Saskatchewan

References

Montrose No. 315, Saskatchewan
Unincorporated communities in Saskatchewan